Luis Ricardo Esqueda Ornelas (born 25 February 1981) in Aguascalientes, Mexico, is a Mexican retired professional footballer, who played as midfielder or full-back for Querétaro in the Liga MX.

Career

Return to Querétaro
On 29 December 2015, Club Querétaro announced the return of Esqueda.

Honours

Club
Querétaro
Copa MX: Apertura 2016
Supercopa MX: 2017

References

1981 births
Living people
People from Aguascalientes City
Footballers from Aguascalientes
Association football midfielders
Mexican footballers
C.F. Pachuca players
Indios de Ciudad Juárez footballers
Chiapas F.C. footballers
Querétaro F.C. footballers
Club Puebla players
Liga MX players